The Church of the Holy Redeemer is a Catholic church situated on the Main Street in Bray, County Wicklow, Ireland. It is the largest church in Bray.

While its records date back to February 1792, the current church dates largely from the late 1890s with the modernist front, porch, side projections and tower added during a reconstruction in 1965.

A youth centre was completed behind the church in 2008 and is accessed via Herbert Road. This centre was opened in August 2008.

The parish has a connection with Saint Cronan's Boys' National School amongst other local primary and secondary schools. The parish provides the sacraments of Communion and Confirmation to the children of the local schools. They also help to raise funds for their twin parish of Ikanga in Kenya.

Little Flower Hall
The "Little Flower Hall" is the parish hall of the church. It was the home of Bray Male School between the years of 1880 and 1931.

References

External links 

 

Churches in Bray, County Wicklow
Churches of the Roman Catholic Archdiocese of Dublin
Roman Catholic churches completed in 1792